Anges ABC is a Gabonese football club based in Libreville, Gabon. The club currently plays in Gabon Championnat National D2

In 1978 the team has won the Gabon Championnat National D1.

Stadium
Currently the team plays at the 7000 capacity Stade Augustin Monédan de Sibang.

Honours
Gabon Championnat National D1: 1978

References

External links

Football clubs in Gabon